The Kurt Maschler Award (1982 to 1999) was a British literary award that annually recognised one "work of imagination for children, in which text and illustration are integrated so that each enhances and balances the other." Winning authors and illustrators received £1000 and a bronze figurine called the "Emil".

The Award was founded by Kurt Maschler, best known as the publisher of Emil and the Detectives by Erich Kästner (1929). By the time it was discontinued after covering 1999 publications, it was run by Booktrust and Tom Maschler, a British publisher and the son of the founder. At that time it was announced in December of the publication year.

Winners

Seven of the 18 winning works were written and illustrated by one person, including two by Anthony Browne. As illustrators Browne won three awards (five Emils in all) and Helen Oxenbury won two, each including one new edition of Alice's Adventures in Wonderland by Lewis Carroll (1865). Browne and Carroll were the only authors of two winning works.

The first two Maschler Award-winning books and the last one also won the annual Kate Greenaway Medal from the Library Association, recognising the year's best children's book illustration by a British subject. Gorilla (1983), illustrated by Anthony Browne, and Helen Oxenbury's edition of Alice in Wonderland (1999) were named two of the top ten Greenaway-winning works (1955–2005) for the 50-year celebration of that Medal in 2007.
Three others were highly commended runners up for the illustrators Medal, a distinction that was roughly annual at the time: Browne's edition of Alice, Oxenbury for So Much, and Patrick Benson for The Little Boat.

See also

 Kate Greenaway Medal 
 Mother Goose Award 
 Caldecott Medal

References

British children's literary awards
Illustrated book awards
Awards established in 1982
1982 establishments in the United Kingdom
Awards disestablished in 1999
1999 disestablishments in the United Kingdom